Burak Sergen (born 9 February 1961) is a Turkish actor. He has appeared in more than thirty films since 1996.

Selected filmography

Film

Television

References

External links 

1961 births
Living people
Turkish male film actors